The 2003 Swale Borough Council election took place on 1 May 2003 to elect members of Swale Borough Council in Kent, England. One third of the council was up for election and the Conservative Party stayed in overall control of the council.

After the election, the composition of the council was:
Conservative 25
Labour 11
Liberal Democrats 11

Election result

Ward results

References

2003
2003 English local elections
2000s in Kent